The Iranian Journal of Numerical Analysis and Optimization is a quarterly peer-reviewed open-access scientific journal covering numerical analysis and optimization. It was established in 2008 and is published by the Ferdowsi University of Mashhad. The editor-in-chief is Ali. R. Soheili. The journal is indexed and abstracted in Scopus and zbMATH Open.

References

External links

Publications established in 2008
Mathematics journals
Quarterly journals
English-language journals
Ferdowsi University of Mashhad
Creative Commons Attribution-licensed journals